Athelstan Braxton Hicks (19 June 1854 – 17 May 1902) was a coroner in London and Surrey for two decades at the end of the 19th century. He was given the nickname "The Children's Coroner" for his conscientiousness in investigating the suspicious deaths of children, and especially baby farming and the dangers of child life insurance. He would later publish a study on infanticide.

He was the son of Dr John Braxton Hicks, the well-known obstetrician, born in Tottenham, London.

Career
He was a barrister at law who entered the Middle Temple in 1872 and was called to the bar in 1875. He was a special pleader on the Western Circuit and at the Middlesex Sessions. He was for some time a student at Guy's Hospital, where he gained considerable knowledge of medical jurisprudence. He was Deputy Coroner of the City of London and Borough of Southwark, the City of Westminster and the West London District. He was appointed Coroner in 1885 for the South-Western District of London and the Kingston Division of Surrey. For a time he served on the Joint Committee of the British Medical Association and the Coroners Society, of which he was honorary Secretary.

He wrote a pamphlet entitled "Hints to Medical Men Concerning the Granting of Certificates of Death" (London: William Clowes, 1889).

He made several reforms, notably that inquests were no longer held in public houses, and an improvement in providing local mortuaries.

He insisted that a full post-mortem be carried out on bodies. In 1898 he took a doctor, James Mackay, to court for perjury; Mackay had claimed to have performed a post-mortem on a 17-week child but when two other doctors examined the body they found no evidence that Mackay had done so.

Some of his more unusual inquests were the Pimlico poisoning by chloroform, the inquest on a body of a baby sent to the Home Secretary, the 'Lambeth Poisoning Case', the 'Tooting Horror', and the "Railway Murder" of Miss Camp.

One of his inquests, Elizabeth Jackson, has been linked, probably incorrectly, with the Jack the Ripper murders.

In the case of the 'Lambeth Gangs' he dealt with the murder of Henry Mappin by a street gang, the original Hooligans, who threatened witnesses and himself.

In the 'Battersea Cancer Cure' inquest he dealt with an unqualified "Dr Ferdinand" who advertised his claim to be able to cure cancer. It was not until the Cancer Act 1939 that advertisements for cancer cures were made illegal.

At the end of the 19th century there were more suicides from carbolic acid than from any other poison because there was no restriction on its sale. Braxton Hicks and other coroners called for its sale to be prohibited.

He gave evidence in 1890 and 1896 to the Select Committee on Infant Life Protection.

In 1899 Braxton Hicks wrote to the Home Secretary, Sir Matthew White Ridley, about the Police Order issued by the Metropolitan Commissioner of Police, Sir Edward Bradford, and the recovery of bodies in the Thames. In 1900 he succeeded in a reform of coroners being notified of the deaths of lunatics held in Poor Law Institutions.

In the Kingston District in 1901 he held 201 inquests: 121 males and 79 females with one case of treasure trove. The verdicts were murder 4 (3 newborn children), manslaughter 1, suicide 23, accidental 51, suffocated in bed 4, found drowned 10, excessive drinking 13, want of attention at birth 3. Infants under one year accounted for 42 of these. There were also 810 inquests in the South-Western district.

Infanticide
Infanticide was common in the Victorian period for social reasons, such as illegitimacy, and the introduction of child life insurance additionally encouraged some women to kill their children for gain. Examples are Mary Ann Cotton, who murdered many of her 15 children as well as 3 husbands, Margaret Waters, the 'Brixton Baby Farmer', a professional baby-farmer who was found guilty of infanticide in 1870, Jessie King hanged in 1889, and Amelia Dyer, the 'Angel Maker', who murdered over 400 babies in her care.

Finding the dead bodies of murdered babies on the streets was common; 276 were recorded in London in 1870. Braxton Hicks held many inquests for bodies of children found in the street or on the banks of the Thames, such as in the 'Battersea Mystery', where the body of a baby was found by the Thames after being thrown into the water alive. The father was found guilty of manslaughter and sentenced to 20 years. This was unusual, for example in the inquest of new born baby that died of head injuries the jury concluded that there was not sufficient evidence on its cause.

In many cases of infanticide the jury returned verdicts of wilful murder against some person or persons unknown but the police could not identify the child's parents. In another inquest in 1891 on the body of a baby girl found in the Thames "we have had about ten similar cases" where "as soon as the child is born, its head is knocked all to pieces and the body is then thrown into the river".

Obtaining convictions for the manslaughter of infants was difficult. For example, the case of Matilda Muncey, a registered baby farmer, who had had 36 children of whom 12 had died. She had an unregistered child, Evelina Marsh, who died of malnutrition. She was acquitted of manslaughter and was only fined £5 for neglecting to register the child and sent to prison for a month for not giving information to the coroner. The judge commented "that nothing was more likely to kill or more difficult of proof than the improper way of feeding."

Ada Chard-Williams
The 1898 inquest on the body of a three months old girl who was strangled, "one of a series of cases in which children other than newly-born infants had recently been murdered and thrown away." There were other similar cases. He carried out the inquest on Selina Jones, whose body was washed up on the Thames at Battersea in 1899, and had been strangled by Ada Chard-Williams, a baby farmer who was later hanged at Newgate prison.

Amy Gregory
Braxton Hicks held the inquest in 1895 on the death of Frances Maud Gregory, aged six weeks, the child of Amy Gregory (23), whose dead body was found on the ice in the Old Deer Park, Richmond. The mother was convicted of strangling her illegitimate child but granted a reprieve from execution by the Home Secretary. There were calls for more lenient sentences for infanticide leading to the comment "one reason why in all ages infanticide has been so lightly regarded is that it is a crime of which no man can in his own person by possibility be a victim. It is quite right that Amy Gregory should not be hanged; but the further cry that she should not be punished, is a plea that all women should be absolute over the lives of their little children." "Are we really going half-mad with pity for everybody except the totally defenceless? If not, why in the name of Christianity, as well as common-sense, do we object to the Home Secretary protecting babies of three months from being throttled?"

Overlaying
Overlaying, where the child is accidentally smothered in bed, was common especially in overcrowded conditions or where the parents had been drinking. Braxton Hicks announced that he would disallow the expenses of the parents where he thought that the parents had been careless.

At an inquest in 1895 on the death by over-laying of a second child to a couple who had earlier received a caution, when the jury returned a verdict of accidental death he said

There had been "during the last ten months no less than 500 cases had occurred in which children had been suffocated while in bed with their parents, in London alone." He estimated that a third of the allegedly accidental deaths of children were due to suffocations.

However, he operated a poor box and could be generous when confronted with poverty: "it was no use reading the father a lesson on sleeping in a crowded room, for he was hard-up and could not pay for large apartments. The jury returned a verdict of "Accidental death," and expressed its opinion that the father had done the best he could in the circumstances."

Friendly Societies Act
In 1889 Mr Braxton Hicks wrote a letter to The Times about the dangers of child life insurance, as outlined in the Friendly Societies Act 1875 which provided for payments on death of children, denouncing the practice of insuring children's lives to pay the expenses of their burial. He wrote that the insurances act as a temptation to the parents to neglect them, or feed them with improper food, and sometimes even to kill them, as in the excessively numerous cases of "over-laying" or suffocating in bed.

He then listed eleven proposals for amending the Act:-
 That no child should be insured under the age of at least five years, or, if insured, that no money should be paid if it died under the age of five years.
 That the amount to be paid on such deaths should be commensurate with the expenses of the burial.
 That in no case should the amount to be paid for burial exceed the sum of £2 10s.
 That only parents should be allowed to insure, and then only when the child is in their care and charge.
 That if the child attains the age of 16 years it should be compulsory on insurance companies to give a surrender value for the policy. This would encourage thrift in the parent, for by the time the child was 16 years it would, presumably, be able to contribute towards its own keep, and the parent could then recoup himself for the expenses he might have been put to in insuring against the possible death of his child, or, should he be so minded, he might use the money for furthering the child's interests.
 That after the age of 16 years the child might be allowed to continue the policy for his own benefit (if it has not been surrendered) for the same or an increased amount.
 Should the child die under the age of five years, the insurers should be allowed, if they desire it, to receive back a certain proportion of the premiums. This would be no greater loss to the companies than the present system of paying in full the insurance money at any age.
 That in each district the insurance companies should appoint an undertaker, who should conduct the funeral of all children insured on behalf of the company, and themselves defray all such expenses and account to the company for the same, thus preventing any cash payments being made the friends.
 That the deaths of all children whose lives are insured should be reported to the coroner in the same way as under the Infant Life Protection Act, not of necessity that an inquest should be held, but that an inquiry should be made by the coroner's officer as to the circumstances surrounding the death, who should report the matter to the coroner for his decision as to the necessity of holding any further inquiry, and that no such death should be registered without the authority in writing of the coroner.
 That where the coroner and his jury consider that the child has been improperly treated, though such treatment may not amount in law to negligence sufficient to maintain manslaughter, the coroner shall be empowered to endorse the same upon his certificate of death, and thus give notice to the insurance companies that no money was to be paid upon such death.
 That the present rules as regards the certificate of the registrar to the insurance companies to prevent multiple insurances should be retained.

He gave evidence in 1890 to the Committee of the House of Lords investigating Child Life Insurance. The recent Deptford poisoning case, where Mrs Winters had poisoned three people and set up multiple insurance policies, was raised.

The Friendly Societies Act 1896 subsequently did bring in limitations on the amount payable on the death of a child.

Stillbirth
He also commented on the lack of recording of stillborn babies. Under British law stillborn babies were not registered and were not required to be buried in public burial grounds. Recording a birth as stillborn saved on funeral expenses and was a way of concealing infanticide. Undertakers would often store the bodies of stillborn babies for burial in adults' coffins for a small fee.

Amelia Hollis
Braxton Hicks held inquests for two babies that were delivered by Amelia Hollis, a midwife, that were shown to have been suffocated after birth.

He was active against uncertified midwives and the dangers of midwives issuing certificates of stillbirth that could conceal infanticide. "At present it is the easiest thing in the world to dispose of an infant without anyone in authority being in the faintest degree wiser. Many newly-born infants are allowed to die, or are even murdered by the midwife who attends these houses, and it is positively this very interested individual who gives the certificate of still-birth."

He gave evidence in 1893 to the Select Committee about requiring the registration of stillbirths and the dangers of unregistered lying-in houses.

Obtaining manslaughter convictions for suffocating babies, which were then passed off as stillborn, was very difficult, as in the case of the death of Ernest Davy where Hollis was only found to have infringed the Registration Act by recording a stillbirth. Often women would have the charge reduced to concealment of birth. As noted by The Spectator in the Amy Gregory case "this is not one of the cases, unhappily so frequent, of infanticide, in which a mother distracted with shame and fear, has murdered her child almost at the moment of birth, and in which, by a conspiracy of mercy among Judges, doctors, and jurymen, a verdict is always returned of guilty only of concealment of birth."

Massacre of the Innocents
In 1895 The Sun published an article "Massacre of the Innocents" highlighting the dangers of baby-farming, in the recording of stillbirths and quoting Braxton-Hicks on lying-in houses. "I have not the slightest doubt that a large amount of crime is covered by the expression 'still-birth'. There are a large number of cases of what are called newly-born children, which are found all over England, more especially in London and large towns, abandoned in streets, rivers, on commons, and so on. My opinion is that a great deal of that crime is due to what are called lying-in houses, which are not registered, or under the supervision of that sort, where the people who act as midwives constantly, as soon as the child is born, either drop it into a pail of water or smother it with a damp cloth. It is a very common thing, also, to find that they bash their heads on the floor and break their skulls. And it is a peculiar coincidence in these matters that at certain times we will have a concurrence of new-born children found, and their deaths all arising during a certain period of time in exactly the same way."

Registration was finally required by the Births and Deaths Registration Act 1926.

Baby farming
He was active against the practise of baby-farming. The Infant Life Protection Act, 1872 had made registration with the local authority obligatory for any person taking in two or more infants under one year of age for a period greater than 24 hours. Also the Coroner had to be informed of the deaths of such infants.

In a reported case of baby farming Braxton Hicks said "Any child that dies in your quarter, where the cause is not as plain as a pike-staff, shall have an inquest held, and I'll have this case brought before the Children's Society."

The problem with the 1872 Act was that there were widespread exemptions, including relatives, day-nurses, hospitals and foster women. There was no 'authentification' of contracts between parent and baby-farmer. This was highlighted by the Arnold baby-farming inquest. He wrote to the Home Secretary about the case and in 1896 gave evidence to the Select Committee on Infant Life Protection Bill, with the Arnold case as one example.

The Arnold baby-farming case
Mrs Jane Arnold of Wolverton had been 'sweating' infants legally by doing so one at a time. She would take a lump sum for adoption and then pass the child on. She left a child with Mrs Saunders of Richmond and used her address for replies. Her activities came to light in an inquest in 1888 on the death of Isaac Arnold (alias John Bailey), aged 6 months, who died in Tooting. Arnold had placed the boy with Mrs Jessie Chapman of Tooting, who was licensed under the Infant Life Protection Act, and had already received another child, Edward Alexander Lovell, from her. Mrs Chapman notified the coroner. The jury returned a verdict of death from natural causes, but the activities of Mrs Arnold had been reported and were influential in leading to a change in the law. Braxton Hicks noted that she had had at least 25 infants and in his summing up he said:

In 1889 Mrs Arnold was again involved in the inquest of Edward Alexander Lovell, aged 2½, who died in an emaciated state at Newport Pagnell. The child had been received from a Mrs Williams of High Holborn, London when a month old with a payment of £30 for a year's keep. The boy was then handed over to Chapman in Thornton Heath, London, but when she did not receive her payments she returned the boy to Mrs Arnold. The jury were of the "opinion that there has been gross neglect in the case" but were unable to allocate responsibility. They added the rider that: "The jury are strongly of opinion that further legislation in what are usually known as baby farming cases is greatly needed, and particularly that the required legislation should extend to the care of one infant only, and that the age of the infant should not be limited to one year, but rather to five years and that it should be an offence for any person undertaking the care of such infant to sub farm it."

The Infant Life Protection Act of 1897 finally empowered local authorities to control the registration of nurses responsible for more than one infant under the age of five for a period longer than 48 hours. Under the Children's Act of 1908 "no infant could be kept in a home that was so unfit and so overcrowded as to endanger its health, and no infant could be kept by an unfit nurse who threatened, by neglect or abuse, its proper care and maintenance."

Accidental death
Other causes of death were also dealt with. 

The 1908 Children's Act introduced legislation for the use of domestic fireguards.

In 1897 he was the principal witness before the Select Committee on Petroleum describing how the Coroners' Society wanted restrictions on the sale of cheap and dangerous paraffin lamps. He later wrote to The Morning Post about the safety standards of paraffin lamps.

At an inquest on a boating accident at Kew in which two men, Cazaly and Geraty, drowned, he "referred to the carelessness and indifference of watermen in letting out small boats to persons who possessed no knowledge of rowing", which led to the licensing of small boats.

He also campaigned for the control of the sale of poisons.

Personal life

He married Fanny Sarah Sutton, daughter of Dr Sutton, in 1883 at St Gabriel's Church, Warwick Square. They had a daughter and a son, the pathologist John Athelstan Braxton Hicks M.D., M.R.C.P. (1885–1935).

He took a keen interest in promoting swimming for children and was president of the Battersea Swimming Club.

He died 17 May 1902 at his home in Lupus Street, Pimlico, from pneumonia. Following a service at St Gabriel's Church his funeral was at Norwood Cemetery on 21 May 1902.

References

British coroners
1854 births
1902 deaths
English barristers
Infanticide
Burials at West Norwood Cemetery
People from Pimlico
People from Tottenham
British social reformers
History of the London Borough of Richmond upon Thames
History of the Royal Borough of Kingston upon Thames
19th-century English lawyers